Heinrich Homann (6 March 1911 – 4 May 1994) was a communist politician and former Wehrmacht officer who held a number of offices in the German Democratic Republic.

Biography

Heinrich Homann was born the son of a shipping company director in Bremerhaven in 1905. He studied law at the universities of Tübingen, Jena, Göttingen, and Hamburg. In 1933 he joined the Nazi Party and the following year entered the military. He eventually rose to the rank of Major in the Heer and fought on the Eastern Front in World War II. In 1943 he was taken prisoner by the Soviets at the Battle of Stalingrad. During his time as a prisoner of war, Homann became a member of the anti-Nazi National Committee for a Free Germany.

After the war, Homann returned to Soviet-occupied Germany and began his work in politics. He joined the National Democratic Party (NDPD), which largely represented former members of the Nazi Party and helped bind them to the state ideology of the German Democratic Republic. He was first elected to the Volkskammer in 1949 and held his seat in the chamber for the remainder of his career. He became a Deputy Chairman in the State Council in 1960 and in 1972 he succeeded Lothar Bolz as Chairman of the NDPD. He was removed from the State Council in November of 1989 in the wake of the Peaceful Revolution and expelled from his party the following month.

References

1911 births
1994 deaths
People from Bremerhaven
National Democratic Party of Germany (East Germany) politicians
Members of the Provisional Volkskammer
Members of the 1st Volkskammer
Members of the 2nd Volkskammer
Members of the 3rd Volkskammer
Members of the 4th Volkskammer
Members of the 5th Volkskammer
Members of the 6th Volkskammer
Members of the 7th Volkskammer
Members of the 8th Volkskammer
Members of the 9th Volkskammer
German Army officers of World War II
National People's Army personnel
German prisoners of war in World War II held by the Soviet Union